A conspiracy theory is an allegation that a certain event or events are secretly influenced by a premeditated group or groups of powerful people or organizations working together.

Conspiracy theory may also refer to:

Conspiracy theory (legal term), a theory of a case that presents a conspiracy to be considered by a trier of fact
 Conspiracy Theory (film), 1997 film starring Mel Gibson and Julia Roberts, directed by Richard Donner
 Conspiracy Theory with Jesse Ventura, TV series hosted by former Governor of Minnesota Jesse Ventura
 Conspiracy Theories, 2006 progressive jazz album by Phil Miller's In Cahoots